Riese Pio X (regularly shortened Riese) is a municipality in northeast Italy located in the province of Treviso in the Region of Veneto. The community's name, much like that of Sotto il Monte Giovanni XXIII, commemorates its most famous son, Giuseppe Melchiore Sarto, who later became Pope Pius X.

References

Cities and towns in Veneto
Pope Pius X